Caleb Hunt (October 28, 1786 – July 24, 1834) was a founder of the Monongahela and Ohio Steam Boat Company that built and operated the historic steamboat Enterprise.

Early life
Caleb Hunt was born in Moorestown, New Jersey to Joshua and Esther Hunt, the former Esther Roberts.

In September 1790, Joshua, Esther, Caleb and his four brothers, "with two wagons, seven horses, one cow, and provisions", began a three-week journey to Fayette County in southwestern Pennsylvania. Their destination was a small, but growing, community located on the east bank of the Monongahela River in close proximity to Fort Burd. In those days it was called Redstone Old Fort, or simply Redstone. Later, the name was changed to Brownsville.

Salem
From 1807 to 1810, Caleb lived at either Brownsville or Salem, Ohio. While living in Salem he earned money by teaching school and grinding grain.

Brownsville
In 1810, Caleb made Brownsville his permanent hometown. Elisha and Caleb became partners in the operation of a store that sold general merchandise and was located in the "Neck", as the commercial center of Brownsville was called. The Hunt brothers sold a wide variety of items, ranging from cotton and woolen goods to nails and gunpowder, to local customers. They were ambitious and wanted to expand their mercantile business. To accomplish this Elisha and Caleb Hunt planned to augment the store's local business with interstate commerce via the western rivers.

It was in the "Neck", during autumn of 1811, that a chance meeting occurred between Elisha and Joseph White, a Quaker merchant from Philadelphia. As a result Caleb and Joseph White transported a cargo of general merchandise by keel boat from Brownsville to St. Louis.

Notes

References
 Encyclopedia of American Quaker Genealogy (EAQG), Vol I-VI, 1607-1943
 Ellis, Franklin (1882). History of Fayette County, Pennsylvania: with biographical sketches of its pioneers and prominent men. Philadelphia: L. H. Everts & Co.
 Horn, W. F. [ed.] (1945), The Horn papers: early western movement on the Monongahela and upper Ohio, 1765–1795, volume 3, Scottsdale, PA: Herald Press
 Roberts-Hunt Family Papers, Friends Historical Library of Swarthmore College, Swarthmore, Pennsylvania
 The Friend (1873), "Esther Collins and Ann Edwards", The Friend, a religious and literary journal, Volume XLVI, No. 46 and 47, Philadelphia: William H. Pile, pp. 362, 370-3
 Henshaw, Marc Nicholas (2014). "Hog chains and Mark Twains: a study of labor history, archaeology, and industrial ethnography of the steamboat era of the Monongahela Valley 1811-1950." Dissertation, Michigan Technological University
 Hunt, Caleb (1812). "Caleb Hunt's diary of a trip from Brownsville, Pennsylvania to St. Louis, and return, February to May, 1812". Maryland Historical Society, ID: Q9700000002939. 
 Hunter, Louis C. (1949). Steamboats on the western rivers, an economic and technological history. Cambridge, Massachusetts: Harvard University Press, 1949; reprint, New York: Dover Publications, 1993.
 Hynes, Judy, et al. (1997), The descendants of John and Elizabeth (Woolman) Borton, Mount Holly, New Jersey: John Woolman Memorial Association, pp. 23–4
 Shourds, Thomas (1876). History and genealogy of Fenwick's Colony, New Jersey. Bridgeton, New Jersey: 314–20. 
 Woodward, E. M. (1883), History of Burlington County, New Jersey, with biographical sketches of many of its pioneers and prominent men, Philadelphia: Everts & Peck, pp. 270–1

1786 births
1834 deaths
Businesspeople from New Jersey
People from Moorestown, New Jersey